Patrick F. McDonough (died June 20, 2001 in Plymouth, New Hampshire) was a Connemara, Ireland-born American police officer, attorney, and politician who served as a member of the Boston City Council from 1956–64, 1966–70, and 1972–82. He was the Council President in 1958, 1961, 1973, and 1981.

After leaving the city council, McDonough served as assistant city clerk from 1983 to 1990 and city clerk from 1990 to 1995.

McDonough was an unsuccessful candidate for Suffolk County Register of Deeds in 1958, Massachusetts Treasurer and Receiver-General in 1960, Mayor of Boston in 1963, and United States Representative from Massachusetts's 11th congressional district in 1978.

McDonough was the brother of Boston School Committee member John J. McDonough.

References

2001 deaths
Irish emigrants to the United States
Boston city clerks
Boston City Council members
Politicians from County Galway
Lawyers from Boston
Massachusetts Democrats
American municipal police officers
People with acquired American citizenship
Irish emigrants to the United States (before 1923)